The Minister for Culture and the Arts is a position in the Cabinet of Western Australia. It was first created in 1971, during the Tonkin government, under the title Minister for Cultural Affairs. That title was retained until 1983, when the title Minister for the Arts was adopted. The current title was adopted in 2001.

The current Minister for Culture and the Arts is David Templeman of the Labor Party, who holds the position as a member of the McGowan Ministry. The minister, who generally also holds other portfolios, is responsible for the state government's Department of Culture and the Arts.

List of Ministers for Culture and the Arts
Thirteen people have been appointed as Minister for Culture and the Arts or equivalent. Sheila McHale, who served in both the Gallop and Carpenter governments, held the position for the longest period, 7 years and 220 days. David Parker had two non-consecutive terms as minister, initially in the Burke government and then across the Dowding and Lawrence governments, although he served for just over three years.

In the table below, members of the Legislative Council are designated "MLC". All others were members of the Legislative Assembly at the time of their service. In Western Australia, serving ministers are entitled to be styled "The Honourable", and may retain the style after three years' service in the ministry.

References

Culture and Arts
Ministers, Culture and Arts